The History of Tom Jones – A Foundling is a five-part TV series produced by the BBC in 1997. It features Max Beesley in the title role, alongside Brian Blessed and Samantha Morton.

It is based on the 1749 picaresque novel of the same name by Henry Fielding.

Plot

The plot follows the life of the protagonist, Tom Jones, a charming rascal. Born to a serving wench, but having grown up in the care of Squire Allworthy, he becomes enamoured of his neighbour's daughter, Sophia Western. It follows Tom's adventures in London.

Cast

References

External links
 

BBC television dramas
1997 British television series debuts
1997 British television series endings
1990s British drama television series
Period television series
BBC television miniseries
Television shows based on British novels
English-language television shows
Television shows set in Dorset
Television shows set in London
1990s British television miniseries
Television series set in the 18th century